Köseler (literally "those that are beardless" in Turkish) may refer to the following places in Turkey:

 Köseler, Artvin, a village in the district of Artvin, Artvin Province
 Köseler, Bayramiç
 Köseler, Beypazarı, a village in the district of Beypazarı, Ankara Province
 Köseler, Bigadiç, a village
 Köseler, Çat
 Köseler, Ezine
 Köseler, Gümüşhacıköy, a village in the district of Gümüşhacıköy, Amasya Province
 Köseler, Kahta, a village in the district of Kahta, Adıyaman Province
 Köseler, Korkuteli, a village in the district of Korkuteli, Antalya Province
 Köseler, Kıbrısçık, a village in the district of Kıbrısçık, Bolu Province
 Köseler, Yığılca